Onsaya Joy is a live album by organist Groove Holmes recorded in 1974 and released by the Flying Dutchman label the following year.

Track listing
 "Sweet Georgia Brown" (Ben Bernie, Maceo Pinkard, Kenneth Casey) − 7:03
 "Onsaya Joy" (Richard Holmes) − 15:10
 "Green Dolphin Street" (Bronisław Kaper, Ned Washington) − 7:50
 "Song for My Father" (Horace Silver) − 6:08
 "Misty" (Erroll Garner, Johnny Burke) − 4:55

Personnel
Groove Holmes − organ, organic nova bass
 Orville J. Saunders II − guitar
Thomas Washington, Jr. − drums

References

1975 albums
Albums produced by Bob Thiele
Flying Dutchman Records live albums
RCA Records live albums
Richard Holmes (organist) live albums